Line 2 of the Hangzhou Metro is a north-south rapid transit line, connecting the downtown with the districts of Xiaoshan and Yuhang in Hangzhou.

Opening timeline

Stations

See also
 Hangzhou Metro

References

02
Railway lines opened in 2014
2014 establishments in China
Standard gauge railways in China